Mycolicibacter senuensis (formerly Mycobacterium senuense) is a species of bacteria from the phylum Actinomycetota that was first isolated from the sputum of a patient with an unspecified pulmonary infection. It is non-pigmented and grows slowly at 25–37 °C. It has also been isolated from swine.

References

Acid-fast bacilli
senuensis
Bacteria described in 2008